John Dudley, 1st Duke of Northumberland (1504–1553) was Lord President of the Council 1549–1553, during the minority of Edward VI.

John Dudley may also refer to:

John Dudley, 2nd Earl of Warwick (c. 1530–1554), son of the above
John Dudley (died 1580), MP for Helston and Carlisle
John Dudley (1569–1645), MP for Staffordshire and brother of Edward Sutton, 5th Baron Dudley
John Dudley (c. 1573 – c. 1622), MP for Carlisle
John Dudley (writer) (1762–1856), English writer
John Dudley (physicist), New Zealand physicist
John H. Dudley (1907–1994), American military officer
John Dudley (judge) (1725–1805), Justice of the New Hampshire Supreme Court

See also